is a Japanese footballer currently playing as a defender for FC Ryukyu.

Club career
Murase made his professional debut in a 0–1 Emperor's Cup loss against Matsumoto Yamaga.

Career statistics

Club
.

Notes

References

External links

1998 births
Living people
Association football people from Osaka Prefecture
Osaka Kyoiku University alumni
Japanese footballers
Association football defenders
Cerezo Osaka players
FC Ryukyu players